James Plimmer (second ¼ 1901  – death unknown) was an English professional rugby league footballer who played in the 1920s and 1930s. He played at club level for Castleford (Heritage №).

Background
James Plimmer's birth was registered in Pontefract district, West Riding of Yorkshire, England.

Playing career

County League appearances
James Plimmer played in Castleford's victory in the Yorkshire County League during the 1932–33 season.

References

External links
Search for "Plimmer" at rugbyleagueproject.org
James Plimmer Memory Box Search at archive.castigersheritage.com
Jim Plimmer Memory Box Search at archive.castigersheritage.com

1901 births
Castleford Tigers players
English rugby league players
Rugby league players from Pontefract
Place of death missing
Year of death missing